Alex Byrne may refer to:

 Alex Byrne (footballer, born 1933), Scottish footballer
 Alex Byrne (footballer, born 1997), English footballer
 Alex Byrne (Australian footballer) (1904–1975), Australian rules footballer
 Alex Byrne (rower), Irish rower
 Alex Byrne (librarian), IFLA President